The Pencak Silat at the 1987 Southeast Asian Games was held between 14 September to 17 September at TMII, Jakarta.

Medal summary

Men

Women's

References
 https://eresources.nlb.gov.sg/newspapers/Digitised/Article/straitstimes19870915-1.2.50.28
 https://eresources.nlb.gov.sg/newspapers/Digitised/Article/straitstimes19870916-1.2.46.13.12
https://news.google.com/newspapers?nid=x8G803Bi31IC&dat=19870916&printsec=frontpage&hl=en
 http://eresources.nlb.gov.sg/newspapers/Digitised/Article/straitstimes19870917-1.2.57.22.4
 http://eresources.nlb.gov.sg/newspapers/Digitised/Page/beritaharian19870918-1.1.8

1987 in Indonesian sport
1987
1987 Southeast Asian Games